John Gadret (born 22 April 1979) is a French former professional racing cyclist in cyclo-cross and road racing, currently racing for the USO Bruay-la-Buissière amateur team.

Career

In 2004 he became national cyclo-cross champion of France for the first time. At this stage he was specialized in the cyclo-cross discipline but was beginning to perform well in stage races such as the Deutschland Tour. Gadret won again the French cyclo-cross championships. In the 2006 Giro d'Italia Gadret showed great potential in the mountains by finishing 7th, 6th and 5th on the three mountain stages. He crashed on the 18th stage and was forced to abandon with a broken collarbone. Despite these promising results on the road, Gadret was back in the 2006–2007 cyclo-cross season where he challenged the domination of Belgian Sven Nys in the Koppenbergcross and finished 8th in the UCI World Cyclo-cross Championships. Returning to the road with the aim of competing in his first Tour de France, Gadret took his first road victory at the Grand Prix of Aargau Canton. After the 2007 Tour de France Gadret won the third stage and took the leader's jersey in the Tour de l'Ain which he won the following day.

On Stage 15 of the 2010 Tour de France Gadret caused controversy when he refused to give his wheel to his team leader, Nicolas Roche, following a puncture on the final climb of the day and then began attacking the group ahead of Roche. He later finished 19th overall.

He has won a race against a horse in a charity event.

In the 2011 Giro d'Italia, Gadret finished 3rd overall with a victory on stage 11. He finished 3' 54" behind race winner Michele Scarponi.

He was unable to secure a professional contract after the 2015 season, and returned to the amateur ranks.

Career achievements

Cyclo-cross

1996–1997
 3rd National Junior Championships
1998–1999
 2nd National Under-23 Championships
2001–2002
 3rd National Championships
2002–2003
 2nd National Championships
2003–2004
 1st  National Championships
2004–2005
 2nd National Championships
2005–2006
 1st  National Championships
2006–2007
 2nd National Championships
 Superprestige
3rd Gavere
2007–2008
 2nd National Championships
2010–2011
 2nd National Championships
2012–2013
 3rd National Championships
2015–2016
 3rd National Championships
2016–2017
 3rd National Championships

Road

2005
 3rd Grand Prix de Villers-Cotterêts
 4th Tro-Bro Léon
 9th Grand Prix de Wallonie
 10th Trophée des Grimpeurs
2007
 1st  Overall Tour de l'Ain
1st  Mountains classification
1st Stage 3
 1st Grand Prix of Aargau Canton
 7th Overall Volta a Catalunya
 8th La Flèche Wallonne
2008
 1st Stage 4 Tour de l'Ain
 8th Overall Tour de Romandie
 10th La Flèche Wallonne
2009
 8th Overall Tour de l'Ain
2010
 6th Overall Route du Sud
2011
 3rd Overall Giro d'Italia
1st Stage 11
 6th Tour du Doubs
 7th Overall Tour de l'Ain
2013
 3rd Overall Route du Sud
 3rd Overall Tour de l'Ain
 10th Overall Critérium International
 10th Overall Tour of the Basque Country

Grand Tour general classification results timeline

References

External links

 Palmares at Trap-Friis
 Palmares at Cycling Base (French) 

1979 births
Living people
French male cyclists
Cyclo-cross cyclists
People from Épernay
French Giro d'Italia stage winners
Sportspeople from Marne (department)
Cyclists from Grand Est